Coproica is a genus of flies belonging to the family Lesser Dung flies.

Species
C. acutangula (Zetterstedt, 1847)
C. albiseta Papp, 2008
C. aliena Papp, 2008
C. bispinosa Papp, 2008
C. brevivenosa Papp, 2008
C. cacti (Richards, 1960)
C. coreana Papp, 1979
C. demeteri Papp, 2008
C. dentata Papp, 1973
C. digitata (Duda, 1918)
C. ferruginata (Stenhammar, 1855)
C. flavifacies Papp, 2008
C. ghanensis Papp, 1979
C. hirticula Collin, 1956
C. hirtula (Rondani, 1880)
C. hirtuloidea (Duda, 1925)
C. insulaepasqualis Enderlein, 1938
C. lacteipennis Hayashi, 2005
C. lugubris (Haliday, 1835)
C. microps Papp, 2008
C. mitchelli (Malloch, 1913)
C. pappi Carles-Tolrá, 1990
C. perlugubris Papp, 2008
C. pseudolacteipennis Papp, 2008
C. pusio (Zetterstedt, 1847)
C. rohaceki Carles-Tolrá, 1990
C. rufifrons Hayashi, 1991
C. ruwenzoriensis (Vanschuytbroeck, 1950)
C. saprophaga Papp, 2008
C. serra (Richards, 1938)
C. setulosa (Duda, 1929)
C. thaii Papp, 2008
C. unispinosa Papp, 2008
C. urbana (Richards, 1960)
C. vagans (Haliday, 1833)

References

Sphaeroceridae
Diptera of Asia
Diptera of Africa
Muscomorph flies of Europe
Schizophora genera
Taxa named by Camillo Rondani